Chamois Niortais F.C. is a professional association football club based in Niort, France. Currently playing in Ligue 2, the second highest division of French football, the club was founded in 1925 and initially played in regional leagues around western France. It turned professional in 1985 when the team joined Division 2 and two seasons later, they were promoted to the top tier of French football for the first time in their history. Chamois Niortais lost its professional status in the summer of 2009 when the team was relegated from the Championnat National, but regained it three years later following promotion back to Ligue 2. The following list recognises all the players who have appeared at least 100 times in the league for Chamois Niortais since 1985.

The current record holder for the highest number of league appearances is midfielder Franck Azzopardi, who played 435 league games for the side between 1989 and 2005. Joël Bossis holds the record for most league goals, scoring a total of 51 during his six seasons with the club.

Key
Players in bold font currently play for Chamois Niortais

Players

References
General
Bilan Apparitions en Championnat 1985–2008 (Record Championship Appearances 1985–2008) ChamoisFC79.fr
Specific

External links
Chamois Niortais official website

Chamois Niortais
Players
 
Association football player non-biographical articles